Merauke Integrated Food and Energy Estate (MIFEE) is a project for use of a big area for industry and also palm oil and food crops agriculture in Merauke Regency, South Papua province.

In 2010, up to 90% of the area was still covered by natural forest.
The MIFEE project is expected to cover a 1.2 million hectare area, or a quarter of Merauke.
The presence of a large number of army units in the MIFEE area, which testifies the role of the military in protecting the interests of foreign investors against the local population.
There is a major involvement of Indonesian agribusiness conglomerates.
MIFEE involves land grabbing.
There is much indigenous opposition to the MIFEE project.
The project threatens conservation areas, such as virgin forests and water catchment areas, as well as the habitat of indigenous peoples in Papua.
There were substantial forest fires. MIFEE is valued at approximately $5 billion and aims to dramatically increase agricultural output.
Damage to the natural environment caused by the industrial activities of agribusinesses and palm oil plantations has severely affected the health and food security of these indigenous groups.

The migrants involved in the project will dwarf Merauke's indigenous population.
Violence was used for land ownership.
MIFEE involves intensive land clearing.

It is likely to increase marginalization of traditional communities.
The UN Committee on the Elimination of Racial Discrimination has called for a suspension of the project, until there is a free, informed consent by the indigenous population.

References

Palm oil production in Indonesia
Agriculture in Indonesia